Vorticellidae is a family of ciliates belonging to the order Sessilida.

Genera

Genera:
 Ruthiella Schödel, 1983
 Systylis Bresslau, 1919
 Vorticella Linnaeus, 1767
 Vorticellides Foissner, Blake, Wolf, Breiner & Stoeck, 2009

References

Ciliate families
Oligohymenophorea